Dufayel Island is an island lying near the center of Ezcurra Inlet, Admiralty Bay, in the South Shetland Islands. It was charted and named in December 1909 by the French Antarctic Expedition under Jean-Baptiste Charcot.

See also 
 List of antarctic and sub-antarctic islands

References 

Islands of the South Shetland Islands